Liam Henry (born 28 August 2001) is an Australian rules football player who plays for Fremantle in the Australian Football League (AFL).

Early career

Born in Tammin, 180 km east of Perth, Henry also lived in Port Lincoln, South Australia and Fitzroy Crossing in the Kimberley region of Western Australia, before returning to Tammin to attend primary school. Henry then boarded at Christ Church Grammar School, where he started a business with two classmates selling neckties with indigenous patterns. One of his partners, Isaiah Butters was also later drafted by Fremantle. Henry's father is a member of the Wajuk people of the South West of Western Australia, whilst his mother is Walmadjari from the Kimberley.

As a member of Fremantle's Next Generation Academy, Henry was drafted with the 9th selection in the 2019 national draft, when Fremantle matched Carlton's bid. 

When the 2020 AFL season was postponed due to the COVID-19 pandemic, Henry returned to his parents' home in Derby, Western Australia.

AFL career

He was selected to make his AFL debut for Fremantle in round 13 of the 2020 AFL season in the Sir Douglas Nicholls Indigenous Round against Sydney.

Statistics
 Statistics are correct to the end of round 10, 2022

|- style="background-color: #EAEAEA"
! scope="row" style="text-align:center" | 2020
|
| 31 || 3 || 1 || 3 || 16 || 6 || 22 || 8 || 4 || 0.3 || 1.0 || 5.3 || 2.0 || 7.3 || 2.7 || 1.3
|-
! scope="row" style="text-align:center" | 2021
|
| 23 || 17 || 10 || 9 || 106 || 47 || 153 || 37 || 18 || 0.6 || 0.5 || 6.2 || 2.8 || 9.0 || 2.2 || 1.1
|- style="background-color: #EAEAEA"
! scope="row" style="text-align:center" | 2022
|
| 23 || 2 || 0 || 1 || 8 || 9 || 17 || 5 || 2 || 0.0 || 0.5 || 4.0 || 4.5 || 8.5 || 2.5 || 1.0
|- class="sortbottom"
! colspan=3| Career
! 22
! 11
! 13
! 130
! 62
! 192
! 50
! 24
! 0.5
! 0.6
! 5.9
! 2.8
! 8.7
! 2.3
! 1.1
|}

Notes

References

External links

 
WAFL player profile

2001 births
Living people
Fremantle Football Club players
Australian rules footballers from Western Australia
Indigenous Australian players of Australian rules football
Peel Thunder Football Club players